Fujisawa may refer to:

Fujisawa (surname)
Fujisawa, Iwate, a former town in Iwate Prefecture, Japan
Fujisawa, Kanagawa, a city in Kanagawa Prefecture, Japan
Astellas Pharma, formed from the merger of Yamanouchi Pharmaceutical Co., Ltd. and Fujisawa Pharmaceutical Co., Ltd.
"Fujisawa Loser", a 2008 single of the Japanese rock band Asian Kung-Fu Generation